Arsene Lupin, Detective (French: Arsène Lupin détective) is a 1937 French crime film directed by Henri Diamant-Berger and starring Jules Berry, Gabriel Signoret and Suzy Prim.

Plot
Arsène Lupin decides to run a detective agency in addition to being a gentleman thief. As a detective he happens to cooperate with police in order to unveil the criminal activities of a villain. When he succeeds the villain returns the favour. The unmasked Arsène Lupin manages to escape with the villain's moll as his new companion.

Cast
 Jules Berry as Barnett, alias Arsène Lupin
 Gabriel Signoret as Inspector Béchoux 
 Suzy Prim as Olga Vauban 
 Rosine Deréan as Germaine Laurent 
 Aimé Simon-Girard as the journalist
 Thomy Bourdelle as Cassire 
 Mady Berry as Victoire 
 Abel Jacquin as Brémond

References

Further reading 
 Oscherwitz,Dayna & Higgins, MaryEllen. The A to Z of French Cinema. Scarecrow Press, 2009.

External links

1937 films
Arsène Lupin films
French crime films
1930s French-language films
Films directed by Henri Diamant-Berger
French black-and-white films
1937 crime films
1930s French films